Szkaradowo may refer to these places in Poland:
 Szkaradowo, Greater Poland Voivodeship, a village in Rawicz County, Greater Poland Voivodeship
 Szkaradowo Wielkie, a village in Kwidzyn County, Pomeranian Voivodeship
 Szkaradowo Szlacheckie, a settlement in Kwidzyn County, Pomeranian Voivodeship